Syed Babar Ali OBE (born 15 January 1926) is a Pakistani businessman, philanthropist and former caretaker Finance Minister of Pakistan. He is the founder of Packages Limited, Milkpak Limited–now Nestlé Pakistan and Lahore University of Management Sciences. Syed Babar Ali School of Science and Engineering is named after him.

Early life and family
Syed Babar Ali was born in 1926 to a businessman Syed Maratib Ali in Lahore, Pakistan. His father owned shops in the Walled City of Lahore and was a top contractor of the British Indian Army supplying them with services like logistics and all sorts of items used in regiments. The money was used to invest in land. His mother belonged to the prominent landlord family of Lahore. On his maternal side, his grandmother was a member of the Afghan royal family. He is the brother of Syed Amjad Ali and Syed Wajid Ali.

He received his education from Aitchison College, Lahore. He graduated from Government College, Lahore; for further studies he went to the University of Michigan till 1947, when he moved to newly-created state of Pakistan. He completed his graduation from University of the Punjab, Lahore. He also briefly studied at Harvard School of Business which helped him later founding business school.

Career
In 1970s, Zulfikar Ali Bhutto's nationalization affected his five out of six companies, leaving only Packages Limited. He served as the Chairman of National Fertilizer Company (NFC) helping to set up the country's first ever fertilizer company.

Ali is the Chairman of Sanofi-Aventis Pakistan Limited, Siemens Pakistan Engineering Company Limited, and Coca-Cola Beverages Pakistan Limited. He believes in the joint venture philosophy and most of his businesses are joint ventures with major multinationals.

In 1992, he founded 'Ali Institute of Education' for training of primary and secondary school teachers. He served as the Minister of Finance, Economic Affairs & Planning in the caretaker setup in 1993.

Ali promoted the cause of the World Wide Fund for Nature where he served in various positions, both in Pakistan and internationally, from 1972 to 1996. He was the International President of WWF from 1996 to 1999 succeeding Prince Philip, Duke of Edinburgh.

Awards
Ali received honours and awards from the Government of Sweden, the Government of Netherlands, an Order of the British Empire from Britain (1997), and was awarded an Honorary Doctorate Degree of Laws from McGill University, Montreal, Canada (1997).

References

External links
 Archival Photographs of his marriage in 1954, from Life Magazine

1926 births
Living people
Pakistani philanthropists
Pakistani people of Afghan descent
Finance Ministers of Pakistan
Aitchison College alumni
University of Michigan alumni
Harvard Business School alumni
Lahore University of Management Sciences
Businesspeople from Lahore
World Wide Fund for Nature
University of the Punjab alumni
Pakistani company founders
Founders of Pakistani schools and colleges
Syed Babar
Pakistani Members of the Order of the British Empire
People from Lahore